The intralaminar thalamic nuclei (ITN) are collections of neurons in the internal medullary lamina of the thalamus that are generally divided in two groups as follows:
 anterior (rostral) group
 central medial nucleus
 paracentral nucleus
 central lateral nucleus
 posterior (caudal) intralaminar group
 centromedian nucleus
 parafascicular nucleus

Some sources also include a "central dorsal" nucleus.

Degeneration of this area can be associated with progressive supranuclear palsy and Parkinson's disease.

See also
 Central tegmental tract
 Output of the ARAS

References

External links
 Diagram at University of Florida

Thalamic nuclei